The  is a Japanese translation of the Bible published in 2018 by the Japan Bible Society. It is a revision of the New Interconfessional Translation Bible (NIT) of 1987, the first revision in 31 years.

Like the NIT, the JBSIV is an ecumenical translation of the Bible by Japanese Catholic and Protestant Christians. Their aim, as with its predecessor, was to create the standard version of the Bible for the "next generation" of Christians, used for worship and study by both Catholics and Protestants in Japan. The translation team was made up of 60 percent Protestants and 40 percent Catholics.

History
The 1987 translation, despite becoming the most used version of the Bible in Japan with 80 percent of Christians and 70 percent of churches (as well as the entirety of the Catholic Church in Japan) using it, according to a survey by the Japan Bible Society in 2005, was subject to scrutiny in a 2010 questionnaire published by  when inconsistencies in the translation of words throughout the text were pointed out and the public expressed interest in a revision in order to improve it. These inconsistencies originated from a sudden shift in translation philosophy, from dynamic equivalence to formal equivalence, partway through the original translation, and even dating back to the 1978 Interconfessional Translation New Testament. The most notable inconsistencies were found in the Gospels, the Book of Job, and the Psalms.

Nevertheless, the Japan Bible Society had for several years before been examining the New Interconfessional Bible text, considering how to create a new Bible translation for the "next generation". The results of this research led them to the Nieuwe Bijbelvertaling, a highly acclaimed ecumenical translation of the Bible published by the Netherlands Bible Society in 2004, and to the Skopos theory of translation, which states that each part of the text should be translated according to its original intentions, rather than rigidly literal or loosely dynamic as a one-size-fits-all solution; this theory sought to prevent prose intended to be read literally from being translated too loosely, or poetry or idiomatic language from being translated so literally as to lose its intended original meaning. Upon inviting Professor Lourens de Vries of Vrije Universiteit Amsterdam, a chief proponent of the theory, to discuss it with them, the Japan Bible Society formally adopted the theory as the translation philosophy for their future translation in order to achieve a "prestigious and beautiful Japanese that is suitable for reading in worship services."

In 2009, the board of directors of the Japan Bible Society officially decided to undertake the revision of the NIT Bible and, on March 2, 2010, they held a press conference to announce the start of the translation project that would result in the JBSIV, which would be completed in 2017 after eight years of work, and published in 2018.

According to the annual report by the Japan Bible Society for the year 2019, published in 2020, 31 percent of all Bibles distributed by them were the JBSIV translation; still 63 percent were the NIT.

See also
 Japanese New Interconfessional Translation Bible
 Bible translations
 Bible translations into Japanese
 Christianity in Japan
 Catholic Church in Japan

References

2018 books
2018 in Christianity
Christianity in Japan